Cyrus Faryar (born February 26, 1936) is an Iranian-American folk musician, songwriter and record producer. He was active in musical, theatrical and performance events in high school. After graduating from high school and attending college, he became involved in the entertainment industry, opening the first coffee house in Hawaii.  He later moved to Southern California and became active with several groups. When Dave Guard left the Kingston Trio to pursue his interest in early folk music styles, Guard asked Faryar to join his new group, the Whiskeyhill Singers. After the Whiskeyhill Singers disbanded, Faryar moved to San Diego to perform with other folk musicians. After his San Diego period, Faryar returned to Hawaii, where he helped form the Modern Folk Quartet, and produced two records in his eclectic neo-folk style. Still living in Hawaii, he continues to perform occasionally with his recognizable and distinctive deep baritone voice.

Early life, family and education 
Cyrus Faryar was born in Tehran, Iran to a family of Persian descent.   He and his family lived in England for several years before moving to Hawaii, where he was a childhood friend of folk singer Dave Guard. He attended Punahou School, graduating in 1953. He attended the University of Hawaii in Manoa Valley, but left before obtaining his degree.

Professional life and accomplishments 
By 1957, Faryar's avant-garde interests led him to establish a "beat" style coffee house in Honolulu. Faryar's Greensleeves coffee house was, like those popularized first by San Francisco's beat generation in the Broadway section of the city, a gathering place for local musicians, poets and writers.

By 1961, Faryar had left Honolulu and established himself in San Diego. Dave Guard then recruited him to join his new group, the Whiskeyhill Singers, who also included Judy Henske.

After the Whiskeyhill Singers broke up, Faryar returned to Hawaii and formed a new singing group, the Modern Folk Quartet, with Chip Douglas, Henry Diltz and Jerry Yester, which lasted three years before disbanding in 1966.

At the Monterey Pop Festival in June 1967, Faryar led a band dubbed the "Group With No Name." Later that year, he collaborated with Mort Garson and synthesizer virtuoso Paul Beaver, providing the narration for the album The Zodiac: Cosmic Sounds, a pioneering psychedelic LP on Elektra Records. In 1968, he performed on Cass Elliot's album Dream a Little Dream.

Faryar released two solo albums as a singer-songwriter in the early 1970s, but became better known as a producer, particularly for the Firesign Theatre, and for playing in sessions for Linda Ronstadt and others. He has also continued to record and tour with reformed versions of the Modern Folk Quartet (or Quintet), as well as recording Hawaiian music.

Discography
1967: The Zodiac: Cosmic Sounds
1971: Cyrus
1973: Islands

References

External links
 Article by Richie Unterberger
The Zodiac's Cosmic Sounds at myspace

1936 births
Living people
Musicians from Tehran
Punahou School alumni
American singer-songwriters
Elektra Records artists
Modern Folk Quartet members
Whiskeyhill Singers members